Georges Robert Edmond Gilson (born May 30, 1929) is a French Catholic bishop.

Life
Gilson was ordained a priest in 1957. In 1974, he was appointed vicar general of the Archdiocese of Paris. Since 1976, he served as auxiliary bishop to Cardinal Marty of Paris. 

On the appointment of Cardinal Lustiger as Archbishop of Paris, Gilson was rapidly appointed to the see of Le Mans (1981). From 1996 to 2004 he served as Archbishop of Sens-Auxerre (the see lost its metropolitan functions in 2002) and simultaneously as Prelate to the Mission de France (Pontigny). He retired on 31 December 2004.

Notes

1929 births
Living people
Bishops of Le Mans
Archbishops of Sens
20th-century Roman Catholic archbishops in France
21st-century Roman Catholic archbishops in France